The Tasmanian Government Railways M class was a class of 4-4-2+2-4-4 Garratt steam locomotives operated by the Tasmanian Government Railways.

History

In 1912, the Tasmanian Government Railways took delivery of two 4-4-2+2-4-4 Garratt locomotives from Beyer, Peacock & Co, Manchester. They were designed to haul express passenger trains between Launceston and Hobart. With the introduction of the R class, M1 was withdrawn in 1923 and sold to the Mount Lyell Mining and Railway Company while M2 was withdrawn in 1931 and scrapped in 1953.

Namesake
The M class designation was reused by the M class that was introduced in 1952.

References

Beyer, Peacock locomotives
Railway locomotives introduced in 1912
Steam locomotives of Tasmania
3 ft 6 in gauge locomotives of Australia
Garratt locomotives